Mithridates III ( Mihrdāt) was king of the Parthian Empire from 87 to 80 BC. His existence is disputed in scholarship.

Biography 
Mithridates' year of birth is not specified by ancient historians, but his coin mints illustrate him as a middle-aged man. He was probably a son of Mithridates II. In July/August 87 BC, Mithridates III usurped the Parthian throne from Orodes I. Around the same period, the Seleucid ruler Demetrius III Eucaerus besieged his brother Philip I Philadelphus in Bereoa in Syria. The governor of the city, however, called on Aziz, an Arab phylarch (tribal leader), and the Parthian governor Mithridates Sinaces for help; with their aid, Demetrius III was defeated and taken hostage to Mithridates III, who treated him with "honour" until he died of illness. In August/September 80 BC, Mithridates III was dethroned in Babylon, and was shortly afterwards expelled from Susa by Orodes I. Mithridates III may have survived this event and managed to flee to the north, where he continued fighting until he died the following year. Other scholars, however, do not support the existence of a Mithridates III ruling in the 80s BC. According to Rahim M. Shayegan (2011), the existence of rival kings during Orodes I's reign "repose primarily upon numismatic evidence, may find scant support in the literary and documentary sources, and can be contradicted by a diverging interpretation of the period's coinage."

References

Sources

Further reading 
 

1st-century BC deaths
1st-century BC Parthian monarchs
Year of birth unknown
Parthian Dark Age